Leo Olavi Suni (May 18, 1891 – May 31, 1942) was a Finnish diver who competed in the 1912 Summer Olympics. He was born (and died in) Helsinki, Finland. In 1912 he competed in both the men's 10 metre platform and men's plain high events.

References

1891 births
1942 deaths
Finnish male divers
Olympic divers of Finland
Divers at the 1912 Summer Olympics